Ananda Marga College, established in 1956, is one of the oldest college in Purulia district, at Ananda Nagar, Pundag. It offers undergraduate courses in arts and sciences. It is affiliated to Sidho Kanho Birsha University.

Departments
Higher Secondary Level
Graduation / Degree - Pass & Honours course
Skill Development Course
Yoga & Meditation Course
Diploma Course

Science
Chemistry
Physics
Mathematics
Biology

Arts
Bengali
English
Sanskrit
Hindi
History
Geography
Political science
Philosophy

Campus Facilities
Library - A library with collection of more than 7000 books.
Auditorium - A auditorium with 800 seating capacity. All the programs, seminars and functions are hosted here. 
Playground - for different sports, games and tournaments. 
Labs - Laboratory facilities for subjects like geography, computer, biology, chemistry and physics are available.
Hostel - The college has hostel facility for Boys. There are two boys’ hostels, each seating 20-40 students. 
 Scholarship - Many "government scholarship scheme's are applicable to the students. Hostel stipend is applicable to students who opt for College Hostel during admission time.
RAGGING - RAGGING in any form is banned inside and outside the campus. Strict action will be taken against those indulging in ragging. Suspension and or withdrawal from the hostel/college is one of the actions taken immediately. Supreme court has also defined ragging as a criminal offense.

Accreditation
The college is recognized by the University Grants Commission (UGC).

Location
Ananda Nagar is situated in the north-eastern part of India, in the heart of Rarh. Rarh was the starting point of civilization and was once covered by dense forests. Asthi Pahar (Fossil Hill), contains ancient Dinosaur Fossils. 3,500 years ago, The great Maharshi Kapila was born close by in  Jhalda. Maharshi Kapila was not only the first philosopher of the world but also the inventor of algebra and geometry.

Anandanagar, is a land without time, a place where it's sweet and mystic beauty stands as a witness for the human drama of existence.   Living in one of the forgotten areas of India, the lives here move around basic rural activities. The Central Master Unit of Ananda Marga is a growing educational-cum-agricultural complex with over 1200 acres of land in a land of ancient hills, 7 pristine rivers and rivulets and radiant red soil. Today, Ananda Nagar is a dreamland, the dreamland for seekers of peace and tranquillity, the dreamland of educators of teachers and education-conscious students and guardians.

See also 
Ananda Marga missions
List of institutions of higher education in West Bengal
Education in India
Education in West Bengal

References

External links

Ananda Marga College
Ananda Nagar, Purulia
Sidho Kanho Birsha University
University Grants Commission
National Assessment and Accreditation Council
Ananda Marga Pracharya Samgha

Colleges affiliated to Sidho Kanho Birsha University
Educational institutions established in 1956
Academic institutions formerly affiliated with the University of Burdwan
Universities and colleges in Purulia district
Universities and colleges affiliated with the Ananda Marga
1956 establishments in West Bengal